Sh'Nia Demetrice Gordon (born April 9, 1997) is an American professional soccer player who plays as a forward for French club Le Havre of the Division 1 Féminine.

Youth career 
Gordon played for Elite Clubs National League teams D'Feeters of Dallas, Texas, and Gwinnett SA of Gwinnett County, Georgia. She was ranked 52nd in the 2015 Girls IMG Academy 150 player rankings, fifth among forwards in the Texas region, and 22nd among forwards nationally. Gordon also played high school soccer for Richmond Hill High School, where she scored a school-record 59 goals as a senior, and scored 34 goals in 13 matches as a junior.

Collegiate career 
Gordon appeared in 95 matches for the West Virginia Mountaineers women's soccer team, starting in all of them, and scored 25 goals and 15 assists. As a sophomore in 2016, Gordon was named to the NCAA College Cup All-Tournament Team and Big 12 All-Tournament Team.

Club career

FC Metz 
Inspired by her West Virginia teammates Ashley Lawrence and Kadeisha Buchanan, who played professionally after college at Paris Saint-Germain and Olympique Lyonnais, respectively, Gordon also planned to play professionally in France. She also entered the 2019 NWSL College Draft but was not selected. FC Metz extended her an offer, and she accepted and played with the team until its relegation to Division 2 Féminine after the 2019–20 season.

Dijon FCO 
Following FC Metz's relegation, Gordon joined Dijon FCO on a two-year contract. She played for Dijon in the 2020–21 Division 1 Féminine season, where she scored seven goals in 22 league appearances.

CSKA Moscow 
In August 2021, CSKA Moscow bought Gordon's contract from Dijon FCO, where she played until the 2022 Russian invasion of Ukraine, which started while the team was training in Turkey. One of her matches with CSKA Moscow was a 2021–22 UEFA Women's Champions League qualification match against Apollon Ladies F.C., then managed by Kim Björkegren.

Racing Louisville FC 
With special dispensation granted from FIFA to foreign players to void overseas contracts due to the invasion, Gordon accepted a two-year contract offer on March 15, 2022, from Björkegren, now Racing Louisville FC's head coach, who was also familiar with Gordon during her career in France. CSKA Moscow had reportedly requested a large transfer fee prior to FIFA's contract exception. Gordon's move was so sudden that she left clothing and personal items behind in Russia. She debuted for Racing on March 25, 2022, as a substitute in the 80th minute of a 2022 NWSL Challenge Cup match against Houston Dash.

On July 27, 2022, Racing Louisville FC announced that Gordon had mutually terminated her contract with the club to pursue playing opportunities in Europe.

Career statistics

Club

References

External links 
 Racing Louisville FC profile
 West Virginia Mountaineers profile
 
 
 

1997 births
Living people
American women's soccer players
Women's association football forwards
West Virginia Mountaineers women's soccer players
FC Metz (women) players
Dijon FCO (women) players
ZFK CSKA Moscow players
Racing Louisville FC players
National Women's Soccer League players
Soccer players from Florida
Expatriate footballers in France
Expatriate footballers in Russia